Christian Holtermann Knudsen (15 July 1845 – 21 April 1929) was a Norwegian typographer, newspaper editor, publisher, trade unionist and politician for the Norwegian Labour Party. He is known as chairman of his party in three non-consecutive periods, and also founded what would become the main party newspaper. He served three terms in the Norwegian Parliament.

Career

Media and trade unions
He was born in Bergen as the son of a cooper. He finished a typographer's education in 1865, and worked for several printing presses in Kristiania. Most notably he worked for the weekly newspaper Almuevennen, as typographer for six years and manager for eight years. In 1872 he was among the co-founders of the trade union Oslo Typografiske Forening. He chaired this organization from 1876 to 1878, 1879 to 1882 and 1883 to 1885, and in 1883 he co-founded the first trade union center in Norway, Fagforeningernes Centralkomité.

In 1884 Knudsen established the newspaper Vort Arbeide ('Our Work'), on behalf of the central committee. The first issue was released on 10 May 1884, and led to Knudsen being fired from Almuevennen. He also had to establish his own printing press since none of the existing printing presses wanted to be affiliated with a labourer's newspaper. The fledgling project was marred by economic problems, and the burden of both writing, editing and printing lay chiefly on Knudsen. In 1885 he founded the association Socialdemokratisk Forening, which formally took over the newspaper. The name was changed from Vort Arbeide to Social-Demokraten ('The Social Democrat') in 1886. At the same time, Carl Jeppesen took over as editor-in-chief, although Knudsen would return as editor from 1892 to 1893.

Knudsen expanded the printing press, and published several books, many of which were frowned upon by the establishment. Kristian Stenrud's books were controversial, and Hans Jæger's book Fra Kristiania-Bohemen, published in 1885, was instantly banned upon publication. Jæger was sentenced to eighty days in jail, appealed to the Supreme Court and had it reduced to sixty days. Jæger's defender, Ludvig Meyer, later became both editor-in-chief of Social-Demokraten and leader of the Labour Party. Jæger and Knudsen later tried to circumvent the law and sell the banned book in Sweden, brandishing a fake name Julefortællinger af H.J. ('Christmas Carols by H.J.') on the cover, but this was discovered and the book banned in Sweden as well. Knudsen also received a jail sentence, of eleven days, for publishing a piece about contraception in Social-Demokraten in 1887. Nonetheless, Knudsen became the official stamp printer in 1895.

Political party
Knudsen, inspired by German theories, argued that "socialism [is] the only means" to "help the working estate". He became a co-founder of the Norwegian Labour Party in August 1887 in Arendal. Like the trade unions, the early Labour Party contained both socialist and non-socialist elements. The most important political demand was universal suffrage. Knudsen was a member of the central committee from the beginning, and then became party leader from 1889 to 1890 and 1900 to 1903. From 1899 to 1926 he was a member of Kristiania city council. He was elected to the Norwegian Parliament in 1906, representing the constituency of Grünerløkken, and was re-elected in 1909 and 1912. For the first two terms he was the leader of the parliamentary party group.

Knudsen was a deputy member of the Norwegian Nobel Committee from 1913, and served his third term as party leader from 1911 to 1918. His leadership came to an end when the radical wing, spearheaded by Kyrre Grepp and Martin Tranmæl, took over at the 1918 national party convention. He left the central committee, but returned in 1920. When the less radical wing broke out to form the Social Democratic Labour Party in 1921, Knudsen did not follow; he continued in the central committee until 1924. In 1923 the name of the newspaper Social-Demokraten had been changed again, to Arbeiderbladet ('The Labour Paper'). It became the main organ of the Labour Party, undergoing direct control; the editor-in-chief was also represented in the national party board. As the newspapers became independent in the latter quarter of the twentieth century, the newspaper changed its name again, to the current Dagsavisen.

Knudsen died in 1929.

References

Further reading
 
 

Members of the Storting
Norwegian book publishers (people)
Norwegian printers
Norwegian newspaper editors
Trade unionists from Bergen
Norwegian prisoners and detainees
Politicians from Oslo
Journalists from Bergen
1845 births
1929 deaths
Leaders of the Labour Party (Norway)
Dagsavisen editors